Dixie is an unincorporated historic community in Grant County, Oregon, United States. It was a station on the Sumpter Valley Railway near Dixie Summit. The station was named for Dixie Creek, a tributary of the John Day River near Prairie City. The creek was named for the many gold miners from the U.S. South (nicknamed "Dixie") who worked claims on the creek.

References

Former populated places in Grant County, Oregon
Former populated places in Oregon